A rail integration system (RIS), rail accessory system (RAS), rail interface system, or simply rail system, is a generic term for a standardized system for attaching accessories to firearms. Rail systems are straight mounting brackets (usually made of strips of metal or polymer) on the gun's receiver, handguard, or fore-end stock to allow sliding or variable-position attachments. An advantage of the multiple rail slots is the moveable positions to adjust for optimal placement of each item for each different user, along with the ability to switch different items at different placements due to varying eye reliefs on gun sights. Tactical usage and shooting sports have both benefited from the extra options provided.

Firearm accessories commonly compatible with or intended for rail systems include tactical lights, laser sights, vertical forward grips, telescopic sights, holographic sights, reflex sights, backup iron sights, bipods/tripods, slings, and bayonets.

The common types of rail systems for firearms are the dovetail rail,(including the Soviet variant known as the Warsaw Pact rail), the Weaver rail, the Picatinny rail, SOPMOD, and the Magpul M-LOK.  There are also non-military designs used in shooting sports to attach slings and bipods such as the UIT rail and the Freeland rail.

History 

Original rails were a raised metal strip with the sides undercut, less standardized than the dovetail design, to allow hardware to slide on and be secured by means of compression only.

Design 
Rail systems usually are based on the handguard of a weapon and/or the upper receiver. Modern pistols are on the underside of the barrel. Rails on rifles usually start at the top dead center or 12 o'clock with the next placement at the bottom 180° degrees or 6 o'clock. on the forward section, away from the buttstock.  With both sides at 3 o'clock & 9 'o clock or 90° degrees each side of the top center 0°/360° degrees becomes the 3rd & 4th most common. 1 o'clock or 11 o'clock is popular for the flashlight with a tape switch location placed on user preference. There may be additional attachment rails or holes at each 45 °degree angle position running partially or entirely the length of the handguard.On the Kalashnikov rifles, the Warsaw rail is attached to the left side of the receiver when viewed from the rear. With more modern versions adding Picatinny style rails onto the sides of the handguards of the rifles for the mounting of additional equipment. Due to updating equipment, both styles may be found on some Warsaw Pact weapons.

Modern-designed firearms often include rails made into the body, instead of being an added-on modification. Older firearms may need permanent modifications of having holes drilled and tapped for screw threads to fasten the rail sections to the firearm. This is easier than milling out a dove tail slot for the placement of a gun sight's parts.

Optics such as telescopic sights, reflector sights, holographic sights, red dot magnifiers, night vision sights, or thermal sights may be placed between the iron sights. The rail section may also come in various heights to help align equipment, which may align with the original iron sights inline or below an illuminated optic's center dot, ring or chevron. This is referred to as absolute or lower 1/3 co-witness respectively.

In addition to height variations some rail brackets may be offset at various degrees, 22.5°, 45°, and 90° are the most common, to place accessories and/or backup folding collapsible iron sights. So they are out of the line sight on the top of the firearm and/or to decrease the outer profile edge's size. Then the original sights are a backup if the electronic optic should fail. The rail section may also move weapon-mounted lights forward so the flashlight (UK torch) does not shine and reflect on the firearm directly. Creating shadows and visual impairment from this illumination.

The amount of rail space allows adjustment and personal optimization of each device and tool attached for the user. As designs have advanced the amount of space has succeeded in the actual need for placement space. Thus rail covers and protectors may be added, to prevent snagging on gear and/or plant foliage.

Future rails systems will have the option of carrying power to supply the needs of the increasing electronics mounted to aid the shooter and/or soldier. Standards are still being determined for multiple countries. An example of such is NATO standards NATO Accessory Rail which is the continued improvement and standardization of the Picatinny rail.

Types 

Most RIS equipment is compatible with one or more of the most common rail systems, all of which are broadly similar:

 Dovetail rail: one of the earliest rail systems, relies primarily on friction from the side unit set screw on the mounted accessory to stop longitudinal shifting
 Warsaw Pact rail: a Soviet-designed dovetail rail variant with cut-outs that allows quick side-mounting of optics (e.g. PSO-1 and USP-1) on Dragunov sniper rifles, RPG-7 and RPG-29 grenade launchers, as well as some versions of AKM and AK-74 assault rifles and PK family machine guns.
 Weaver rail: an early improvement design upon the dovetail rail invented by William Ralph Weaver (1905–1975), still popular in the civilian market
 Picatinny rail: the mil-spec standardized rail system evolved from the Weaver rail. Also known as MIL-STD-1913, Picatinny rails date from the mid-1990s and have very strict dimensions and tolerance standards. The Picatinny has a rail of a very similar profile to the Weaver, but the slot width is 0.206 in (5.23 mm), and by contrast with the Weaver, the spacing of slot centers is consistent, at 0.394 in (10.01 mm). Many rail-grabber-mounted accessories can be used on either type of rail, and accessories designed for a Weaver system will generally fit Picatinny rails, although not vice versa. Because of this, with devices that use only one locking slot, Weaver devices will fit on Picatinny rails, but Picatinny devices will not always fit on Weaver rails.
 NATO Accessory Rail: a metric standardized upgrade from the Picatinny rail
 KeyMod: open source "negative space" (hollow slot) design introduced by VLTOR to replace the Picatinny rail for mounting accessories (except for scope mounts)
 M-LOK: a free licensed "negative space" design introduced by Magpul Industries to compete with KeyMod

These are used primarily in the military and by firearm enthusiasts to improve the usability of the weapon, being accessorized quickly and efficiently without requiring the operator to field-strip the weapon. Basic systems such as small rails (20mm is standard) with holes machined in them to be screwed onto the existing hand-guard of a rifle can cost as little as US$25 to US$40. More advanced systems allow for numerous accessories to be mounted simultaneously and can cost upwards of US$200.

Compatibility 

Adapters to other types of rail interfaces may be used for legacy issues and/or to change the surface texture, abrasiveness and/or overall outer circumference of the entire rails system for the fit of the hand. Dovetail rail, Weaver and Picatinny are all outward or raised attachment surfaces. While M-Lok and KeyMod have smooth surfaces with different standards & styles of holes cut into their assembles to place the attachment hardware internally. Both of these styles of features are often on and/or in the hand guards. All make the mounting and dismounting of these objects significantly easier. Items may be fastened by threaded bolts, requiring the use of a screwdriver or Allen wrench, with some tool-free variations of Thumb screws or Thumb nuts, may have threaded quick disconnect lever that pulls the hardware and plates together against the rails. During firearm recoil, the accessory may slide within that section of the rail. To help avoid this, when tightening slide the device forward in the placement slots so the section of the bolt is against the vertical/forward section of rail slots.

Adoption 

The firearm often associated with, and that has benefited from, rails is the M4 carbine and M16 rifle family. With equal and even more use due to additional novelty items is the AR-15. Most modern military and civilian semi-automatic firearms have rails that may replace original parts. Police and military-style firearms may include pistols, PDWs, carbines, rifles, submachine guns, light machine guns and heavy machine guns. HMGs have started to include and use rail sections and options for attachments of optics. Civilian clone rifles are the largest adapters, while crossbows, hunting rifles, shotguns, and handguns may be produced with rail sections either attached and/or made structurally as part of the actual firearm. Airsoft and paintball clone weapons can also have rails.

See also 

 Sling swivel stud
 Zeiss rail

Notes

References 

 
 Magpul Industries - M-LOK DESCRIPTION AND FAQ DOCUMENT
 KeyMod vs. M-Lok: The Next AR Rail Standard by Chris Baker, November, 19, 2014
 KeyMod vs. M-LOK Modular Rail System Comparison, Presented by Caleb McGee, Naval Special Warfare Center Crane Division, 4 May 2017 full pdf on page
 
 M-LOK vs KeyMod comparison 2017 MLok and KeyMod Comparison 3 years later 2017

External links 

 KeyMod vs. M-LOK comparison

Firearm components
Mechanical standards